The 2008 Serbian local elections in Kosovo were held on 11 May 2008, together with Serbia's parliamentary elections and elections in Vojvodina. UNMIK authorities have criticized Serbia organizing elections saying only the UN can organize elections in Kosovo. Kosovo's President Fatmir Sejdiu accused Serbia of trying to challenge Kosovo's statehood.

There is a total of 115,712 registered voters and they were able to vote in 295 voting places. There are 157 voting places in Central Serbia and Vojvodina, and each of the seven major Montenegrin cities has one, for refugees from Kosovo.

Background 
Serbia's elections in Kosovo follow the unilateral declaration of independence by Albanian leadership in Kosovo, a declaration that Serbia considers illegal. This proposal for what many observers have called a de facto partition was said to be in response to unrest in Northern Kosovo and other Kosovo Serb areas. Establishment of Serb institutions in Kosovo is part of the "functional division" of Kosovo proposed by the Serbian government.

Dispute over elections 

UNMIK considers the holding of local elections in Serbia without its agreement as invalid and as a breach of UNSCR 1244. It has, however, proposed to hold local elections in the mostly Serb-populated municipalities of Leposavić, Zubin Potok, Štrpce, Zvečan and Novo Brdo, where the 2007 local elections were declared invalid due to the Serb voters' boycott; however, UNMIK insisted that it would have to organise the elections there, not Serbia, and that the date would likely not be 11 May 2008. UNMIK has no problem with the participation of Kosovo Serbs in the parliamentary election.

However, on 14 April 2008 the Election Commission announced it would hold local elections in Serb areas of Kosovo; internally displaced persons, whether living in Kosovo or not, will be able to vote as if they were living in the municipality from which they were displaced. Minister for Kosovo Slobodan Samardžić subsequently called on Joachim Rücker to sanction the elections. UNMIK spokesman Alexander Ivanko reiterated that UNMIK would view all elections held without its approval as illegal and in breach of UNSCR 1244.

On April 18, 2008 Joachim Ruecker, the Chief of UNMIK, said the elections would cross a “red line” if organized by Serbia.

The International Steering Group for Kosovo has expressed its support for the UNMIK position saying it opposes the "institutional separation by ethnic lines" in Kosovo.

Kosovo's Assembly adopted a statement condemning Serbia's plans to hold local elections in Kosovo and showing support for the position taken by UNMIK and President Fatmir Sejdiu. However, Kosovo police authorities have said they would not interrupt voting to prevent local elections. UNMIK declared the local Serb elections held in Kosovo in May 2008 null and void.

Kosovo Serb Institutions 

Marko Jakšić, a Kosovo Serb political leader and ally of then-Prime Minister Vojislav Koštunica, said Kosovo Serbs would form their own assembly following the elections. He argued that the Kosovo Assembly was dominated by "Albanian puppets" who would not work in the interest of the Serb minority.

Following the elections Samardžić outlined the makeup of the Kosovo Serb institutions consisting of municipal assemblies and executive councils. According to Samardžić municipal governments will act in keeping with the Serbian constitution and resolve all problems independently or in agreement with Belgrade.

UNMIK officials have said they will continue working with appointed Serb leaders declaring the local elections "illegal" and pledging not to negotiate with the elected officials. Yves de Kermabon, head of the EULEX mission to Kosovo, said he was "willing to talk to everybody" including officials elected on May 11, stressing that he would go to Northern Kosovo as soon as he found people there willing to talk. Kermabon said his reason was that he does not want the EU to be "forcibly deployed" there.

The mayor of Mitrovica condemned the formation of a parallel municipal assembly in North Mitrovica by Serbs following the election saying the institution was "illegal" as well as the elections. On June 13, 2008 a parallel assembly with 30 members, the majority from the Serbian Radical Party, was formed for Pristina with the first session being held in a warehouse due to a lack of space. Radovan Nicic was elected president of the municipality by the assembly. Another assembly was formed in Obilic north of Pristina the same morning.

Serbian parties (SRS, DSS, SPS, NS and DS) agreed to form a parliament for Kosovo Serbs including 45 delegates, 43 from the local assemblies and two seats reserved for Romani and Muslims. Slobodan Samardžić announced that the Kosovo Serb assembly would be formed on June 28. He said the body would be representative not executive. The parliament shall only be transitional before direct elections. The parliament was officially scheduled on 16 June 2008 to be held in Priština on 28 June 2008, symbolically on Saint Vitus' Day. Its official name shall be The Assembly of the Community of Municipalities of the Autonomous Province of Kosovo and Metohia. The parliamentary majority has been formed by the Democratic Party of Serbia, Serbian Radical Party, Socialist Party of Serbia and Civic Initiative of Gora. The opposition Democratic Party supports its constitution, but will for now boycott it. The cause of restoration of parliamentarism since 1999 was specifically stated as a reaction to the recently put in act Constitution of Kosovo and will only officialize the two separate systems which were already in act for years. It is pointed out that it is the representative body of Kosovar citizens loyal to the Republic of Serbia.

Results 

The turnout of registered voters was at 57%. Serbian Radical Party came first in 15 municipalities, the DSS has the most councilors in six, as well as various citizens' lists. The Radicals and DSS formed a coalition in the Assembly of the Community of Municipalities of the Autonomous Province of Kosovo and Metohija.

Kosovska Mitrovica District
In the predominantly Serb communities of northern Kosovska Mitrovica, Leposavić, Zubin Potok, and Zvečan, the elected assemblies were able to form de facto municipal governments. In Srbica and Vučitrn, where Serbs constitute a minority of the population, the assemblies formed what were effectively parallel administrations.

Kosovska Mitrovica

The Radical Party and the Democratic Party of Serbia–New Serbia alliance formed a governing coalition following the election. Nenad Topličević of the Radical Party was chosen as mayor. The Serbian government dissolved the local government on 24 December 2009, and Ivica Mirković of the Democratic Party was appointed as head of an interim leadership.

Leposavić

Vlastimir Ratković of the Radical Party was chosen as mayor after the election. The local administration proved unstable, and the Serbian government dissolved the municipal assembly in 2009, after which time Branko Ninić of the Democratic Party became the leader of a provisional council.

Srbica

Dejan Tomašević of the Movement for Srbica (one of the parties in the "Unanimously for Srbica" coalition) was chosen as mayor after the election. He continued as leader of the parallel government until 2013.

Vučitrn

Zoran Rakić of the Radical Party was chosen as mayor of the parallel government after the election.

Zubin Potok

Incumbent mayor Slaviša Ristić of the Democratic Party of Serbia continued in office after the election.

Zvečan

Incumbent mayor Dragiša Milović of the Democratic Party of Serbia continued in office after the election.

Subsequent developments

New elections in 2009
The Serbian government oversaw new local elections in Peć and Priština on 16 August 2009 and in Leposavić on 29 November 2009.

Peć (16 August 2009)

Priština (16 August 2009)

Leposavić (29 November 2009)

Branko Ninić of the Democratic Party, who had previously served as the leader of a provisional council, was confirmed for a new term as mayor. He served until July 2012, when he was replaced by Dragiša Vasić of the Serbian Progressive Party.

New elections in 2010
The Serbian government dissolved the local authorities of Kosovska Mitrovica and Novo Brdo on 24 December 2009 and held new elections on 30 May 2010.

Kosovska Mitrovica (30 May 2010)

Ivica Mirković of the Democratic Party was chosen as mayor in July 2010. He was replaced by Krstimir Pantić of the Progressives in October of the same year, after Pantić's party formed an alliance with the Democratic Party of Serbia. Pantić resigned in March 2013 and was replaced by Dragiša Vlašković, also of the Progressives.

Novo Brdo (30 May 2010)

Unauthorized elections in 2012
The predominantly Serb municipalities of Zubin Potok and Zvečan organized local elections on 6 May 2012, on the grounds that the terms of assemblies elected in 2008 were set to expire. The broader diplomatic situation had changed by this time, and the elections were not recognized as legitimate by the Government of Serbia, the Government of Kosovo, or the international community. 

Following the elections, Oliver Ivanović (at the time a secretary of state in Serbia's ministry for Kosovo and Metohija) indicated that provisional governing councils would be established in both municipalities. Despite the objections from Belgrade, however, new municipal assemblies were constituted in both communities on 30 May 2012. While the Serbian government never formally recognized the legitimacy of the 2012 elections in these municipalities, they did not overturn the local governing authorities until the more general restructuring of state institutions that followed the 2013 Brussels Agreement.

Zubin Potok (6 May 2012)

Incumbent mayor Slaviša Ristić of the Democratic Party of Serbia continued in office after the election.

Zvečan (6 May 2012)

Incumbent mayor Dragiša Milović of the Democratic Party of Serbia was confirmed for another term in office after the election. All lists except the United Regions of Serbia participated in the local government.

2013 Brussels Deal and after

As part of the 2013 Brussels deal all aspects of this election were repudiated and invalidated by Serbia.

Serbian provisional authorities

Kosovska Mitrovica, Leposavić, Zvečan, and Zubin Potok
The Serbian government formally dissolved the parallel local assemblies of Kosovska Mitrovica, Leposavić, Zubin Potok, and Zvečan in September 2013. The following individuals were appointed to lead provisional authorities in these municipalities:

Dragan Jablanović (Movement of Socialists, Leposavić)
Krstimir Pantić (Serbian Progressive Party, Kosovska Mitrovica)
Dragan Nedeljković (Zvečan)
Stevan Vulović (Socialist Party of Serbia, Zubin Potok)

The Serbian government has continued to recognize provisional authorities in these four municipalities since 2013. Their authority exists alongside the authority of mayors and councillors elected in local campaigns overseen by the authorities in Priština. (The Serbian government has encouraged Serbs in northern Kosovo to participate in these elections, and in some cases the provisional authority leaders have effectively held what amount to dual mandates as elected mayors.)

Personnel changes since 2013:

On 25 January 2014, Krstimir Pantić was succeeded as leader of the provisional authority in Kosovska Mitrovica by Aleksandar Spirić.
On 30 September 2015, Dragan Nedeljković was succeeded as leader of the provisional authority in Zvečan by Ivan Todosijević.
On 6 October 2015, Dragan Jablanović was succeeded as leader of the provisional authority in Leposavić by Zoran Todić.
In late 2018, Steven Vulović resigned as leader of the provisional authority in Zubin Potok and was replaced by Srđan Vulović.

Other municipalities
The Serbian government has also appointed provisional authorities in other municipalities, although these do not have the same de facto governing powers as in the four predominantly Serb municipalities in the north. Other leaders of provisional governing bodies since 2013 include:

Srbica: Milomir Jokić (2013–2017?); Rajko Tomašević (2021); Vasilije Tomašević (2021–present)
Vučitrn: Desimir Miljković (2013–2016), Aleksandar Mišić Aca (2016–2021), Milan Kostić (2021–present)

Notes and references 

2008
2008 in Kosovo
2008 in politics
May 2008 events in Europe